The Star Wars Adventure Journal was a publication distributed by West End Games between 1994 and 1997.  Fifteen issues were printed, containing short stories set in the Star Wars expanded universe by both well-known and relatively unknown Star Wars authors (short stories by author Charlene Newcomb depicting the adventures of Alexandra "Alex" Winger, a one-time love interest of Luke Skywalker); adventures and source material for the West End Games version of the Star Wars role-playing game; Galaxywide NewsNets were fictional news reports from throughout the galaxy; interviews with personalities from all walks of Star Wars literature; and reviews of new and upcoming Star Wars products.

Issues Published
Star Wars Adventure Journal 1
Star Wars Adventure Journal 2
Star Wars Adventure Journal 3
Star Wars Adventure Journal 4
Star Wars Adventure Journal 5
Star Wars Adventure Journal 6
Star Wars Adventure Journal 7
Star Wars Adventure Journal 8
Star Wars Adventure Journal 9
Star Wars Adventure Journal 10
Star Wars Adventure Journal 11
Star Wars Adventure Journal 12
Star Wars Adventure Journal 13
Star Wars Adventure Journal 14
Star Wars Adventure Journal 15

Cancelled issues
Star Wars Adventure Journal 16
Star Wars Adventure Journal 17
Star Wars Adventure Journal 18

Reception
Andrew Rilstone reviewed The Best of the Star Wars Adventure Journal for Arcane magazine, rating it a 4 out of 10 overall. Rilstone comments that "If you like the writing of Zahn and Tyers, then this book is probably worth having for the fiction; but if it's roleplaying material you are after, there are better things to spend your credits on."

Reviews
Pyramid

References

External links
 -(this article is derived from Wookieepedia's)

Books based on Star Wars
D6 System